Timothy O'Shea was an academic.

Timothy O'Shea may also refer to:

Timothy Joseph O'Shea (1860–1930), Queensland politician
Tim O'Shea (footballer) (born 1966), football player and manager
Tim O'Shea (born 1962), American basketball coach
Timothy O'Shea (business executive) (1935–1988), American executive, government official, and educational activist
Tim O'Shea (rugby), South African rugby footballer